Javier Ernesto Simán Dada (born 14 June 1964) is a Salvadoran businessman and politician. He is the current owner of the SIMÁN department store chain. As a member of the right-wing Nationalist Republican Alliance (ARENA), he was a pre-candidate for the 2019 presidential election, and he is currently a potential candidate for the 2024 presidential election.

Biography 

Javier Ernesto Simán Dada was born in El Salvador on 14 June 1964.

In the 2019 presidential election, he was a pre-candidate for the Nationalist Republican Alliance (ARENA), but lost the party's nomination to Carlos Calleja.

In April 2020, he was elected as the president of the National Association of Private Enterprise (ANEP), serving until April 2022.

He is a potential presidential candidate for ARENA for the upcoming 2024 Salvadoran general election.

References 

Living people
1964 births
Salvadoran businesspeople
Salvadoran politicians
Nationalist Republican Alliance politicians
21st-century Salvadoran politicians